Okaka may refer to:
Katsuobushi or okaka, dried, fermented, and smoked skipjack tuna.
Okaka, Nigeria, a town in Oke-Ogun area of Oyo State in South West Nigeria which is under Itesiwaju local government area

People with the surname
Stefano Okaka, Italian football player